Shah Siddiq was a 14th-century Sufi saint and one of the 360 auliyas or followers who accompanied Shah Jalal in his Conquest of Sylhet from Turkey. He traced his descent from Abu Bakr Siddiq, the first caliph of Islam. Descendants of Shah Siddiq from Panchpara, Osmanpur Union, Osmani Nagar Upazila (in Bangladesh) carry the surname Siddiquee.

He lies buried in the Panchpara village in Sylhet District, at roughly 24°43'09.7"N 91°46'31.1"E. The Panchpara Shah Siddique (R) Jamea Islamia High School is named after him. His exact date of death remains unknown, however a plaque on his tomb claims that it could be the 21st of August, 1373 A.D.

Older images of his tomb can be found in this website.

References

External links
 
 Eaton, Richard M. The Rise of Islam and the Bengal Frontier, 1204-1760. Berkeley:  University of California Press,  c1993.

Islam in Bangladesh
Bengali Sufi saints